Bronzeville may refer to:

 Another name for the Little Tokyo area of Los Angeles, during World War II
 A neighborhood and district in Chicago, Illinois
 Black Metropolis-Bronzeville District, a historic district within the Bronzeville neighborhood
 King-Lincoln Bronzeville, a neighborhood in Columbus, Ohio
 A neighborhood in Milwaukee, Wisconsin
 Bronzeville (play), a 2009 play by Tim Toyama and Aaron Woolfolk
 Bronzeville (podcast), an audio drama by Larenz Tate and Laurence Fishburne